Candlewood Corner is a small enclave of restaurants and businesses on Route 39 in the town of New Fairfield, Fairfield County, Connecticut, United States. It is in the southeast part of the town and serves as the gateway to New Fairfield's Candlewood Lake communities. The Town Tribune, a local newspaper serving New Fairfield and Sherman is located here.

History
Prior to the construction of Candlewood Lake, this section was known as "Millers Corner" and then later "Hatch’s Corner," before ultimately taking on the name "Candlewood Corner". It is home to the historic Cosier-Murphy House, which is listed on the National Register of Historic Places.

Gallery

References 

Neighborhoods in Connecticut
Populated places in Fairfield County, Connecticut